Epica Etica Etnica Pathos (Epic, Ethics, Ethnic, Pathos) is the last studio album released by the Italian punk rock band CCCP Fedeli alla linea in 1990.

It sounds completely different from their previous works, and could be considered as the “real” first album by C.S.I.

The short, fast, hard music, with stripped-down instrumentation and punk rock melodies were substituted by a more melancholic and declamatory vein.

The album sessions made use of original, and unique techniques for recording instruments and sound effects in rock music. It was directly played, and recorded in a farmhouse in the Emilia Romagna countryside. The use of those techniques, the surrounding ambient, the use of the natural echo made out a really soft sound instead of the clean and sometimes empty uniformity of a usual studio recording.

CCCP reached their zenith with this album, with songs like the complex suites "MACISTE contro TUTTI", or "Aghia Sophia", "Depressione Caspica" and "Annarella".

On 2004, "Amandoti" was covered by Gianna Nannini. "Annarella" was covered by La Crus in their  album Crocevia.

Track listing 

All tracks written by Ferretti/Zamboni/Magnelli/Maroccolo, 
except where indicated.

 "Aghia Sophia" - 9:28
 "Paxo de Jerusalem" - 4:32
 "Sofia" - 1:09
 "Narko'$?" (includes "Baby Blue") - 9:53
 "Campestre" - 3:48
 "Depressione Caspica" - 5:13
 "In occasione della festa" (Traditional) - 1:04
 "«Amandoti» (sedicente cover)" (Ferretti/Zamboni) - 2:51
 "L'andazzo generale" - 4:21
 "Al Ayam" - 3:55
 "Appunti di un viaggiatore nelle terre del socialismo reale" - 5:00 (the real track duration is 0:05)
 "Mozzill'o Re" - 4:22
 "Campestre II" - 0:42
 "Maciste contro tutti" - 11:26
 "Annarella" - 4:24

Personnel 

 Giovanni Lindo Ferretti - vocals
 Massimo Zamboni - Guitar
 Gianni Maroccolo - Bass
 Francesco Magnelli - keyboards
 Giorgio Canali - Guitar
 Ringo De Palma - drums
 Danilo Fatur - “Artista del popolo”, vocals
 Annarella Giudici - “Benemerita soubrette”, vocals

See also
 CCCP discography
 Consorzio Suonatori Indipendenti (C.S.I.)
 Per Grazia Ricevuta (PGR)
 Punk rock

References and footnotes

External links
 Lyrics

1990 albums
CCCP Fedeli alla linea albums
Virgin Records albums
Italian-language albums